Sandra Weintraub Roland is an American soap opera writer and producer. She is most notable for her writing on CBS's The Young and the Restless, which she has written in different positions since 1998.
In the 1970s she was also notable for her close relationship with Martin Scorsese. They lived together for four years during which time she worked on Scorsese's Alice Doesn't Live Here Anymore as associate producer,  and also served in other production capacities on Taxi Driver and Mean Streets. In addition, she appeared briefly, and uncredited, in the latter film. Raised in New York City, she is one of four children of former Warner Bros. production executive Fred Weintraub.

Filmography

Films

Television

Awards
 Daytime Emmy Award, Win, 2006, Best Writing, The Young and The Restless
 Writers Guild of America Award, Win, 2006 season, The Young and The Restless

References

External links
 IMDb bio

American soap opera writers
Daytime Emmy Award winners
Living people
Soap opera producers
American women television writers
Writers Guild of America Award winners
Year of birth missing (living people)
Place of birth missing (living people)
Women soap opera writers
American women television producers
21st-century American women